One World: The Ethics of Globalisation is a 2002 book about globalization by the philosopher Peter Singer.  In the book, Singer applies moral philosophy to four issues:  the impact of human activity on the atmosphere; international trade regulation (and the World Trade Organization); the concept of national sovereignty; and the distribution of aid.

One World Now is an updated version of the book, published in 2016.

References 

2002 non-fiction books
Books by Peter Singer
English-language books
Yale University Press books